Michael Magee (born 7 December 1949) is a British journalist. He is credited with introducing a tabloid-style approach to the coverage of technology news. In 2009 the Daily Telegraph placed Magee 35 in its list of Top 50 most influential Britons in technology.

Magee co-founded technology news website The Register in 1994. In 2001 he left to found The Inquirer. In 2010 he launched technology website TechEye, and in February 2013 he launched a new title for the channel called ChannelEye.

Career
Magee has written since the 1960s on matters related to occult and esoteric religions. In 1971 he started a small occult magazine called Azoth, and in 1973 in conjunction with David Hall, and his girlfriend Janet Bailey, started a more ambitious six monthly magazine called SOTHiS. In 1978, he went to India and met with an English tantrik guru (and former student of Aleister Crowley) called HH Shri Gurudev Mahendranath (1911–1992) who was a guru of the Uttarakaula Tantric Order of northern India. Mahendranath gave him the title of a guru and a charter to form a group of students. Magee took the tantrik name of Lokanath. Later this was to become a nucleus for the "Arcane Magical Order of the Knights of Shambhala" (AMOOKOS). This group was highly influential, particularly in the way it brought Tantrik teachings to the West. In the UK it had about 500 members. In 1990, Mahendranath claimed, despite some evidence to the contrary, that he had not ever given Magee the right to form AMOOKOS and the group fragmented. Since then Magee has concentrated on providing translations for Tantra website Shiva Shakti Mandalam.

Magee worked for VNU Business Publications on PC Dealer before working at their IT news venture VNU Newswire. He left the Newswire and co-founded The Register, the UK's first Internet-based IT tabloid, with John Lettice in 1994. In the newsletter, Magee focused on computer chip reporting, and Lettice covered software.

The Register used the slogan "Biting the Hand That Feeds IT" to reflect its iconoclastic attitude, attracting a following among IT professionals and investors.

In December 2000, Magee suffered a heart attack. When he returned to work, he stated publicly that he disagreed with the editorial direction of The Register.  He left to found The Inquirer to reflect the original editorial philosophy. Unlike The Register, which had substantial capital investment, The Inquirer received little financing, but still managed to make a profit. Magee was the only full-time employee. The entire magazine was based on freelance submissions, and staff and its advertising were outsourced.

In 2006 Magee met with VNU leaders over their alleged use of a web layout similar to that of The Inquirer. Magee sold The Inquirer to VNU later that year. Magee remained as editor of The Inquirer until February 2008, when he left to pursue other publishing ventures including TechEye.
He joined FUD Zilla as Editor-at-Large in July 2016.

Personal life
Magee married Jan Bailey in a civil ceremony in 1978. They later separated, and he now lives in Oxford. His son, Tamlin Magee, has written for The Inquirer  and as news editor on TechEye.

Published works
Editor: The Cipher MSS of the Golden Dawn, Azoth Publishing 1973
Tantrik Astrology, Mandrake Press, Oxford 1989 
Tantra Magick, Mandrake Press, Oxford 1990 

Translations
Kaulajnananirnya of the School of Matsyendranath, Prachya Prakashan, Varanasi 1986
Vamakeshvarimatam, Prachya Prakashan, Varanasi 1986
Matrikabhedatantram, Indological Book House, Delhi, 1986
Kaulopanishad, Worldwide Tantra Series 1995
Ganapati Upanishad, Worldwide Tantra Series 1995
Dhvajadi Prasna, Worldwide Tantra Series 1995
Magic of Kali, Worldwide Tantra Series 1995

References

External links
 Mad Mike Magee's Musings
 IT Examiner
 TechEye

1949 births
Living people
British male journalists
British technology writers
British technology journalists